Following are the analog television stations in the provinces and territories of Vietnam, divided by regions in the country.

As of 28 December 2020, analog television stopped broadcasting nationwide due to the government's digitization roadmap. Previously, analog television in Vietnam was mostly broadcast on the VHF band (from channel 6 to channel 12) and the UHF band (from channel 21 to channel 62). Only a few stations broadcast below R6 VHF, including R3 VHF in Tam Dao, Can Tho (CT3, relay HTV7), and HCMC (OPT1).

VTV Vietnam Channels 

The list below includes the main broadcasting stations. The order of the provinces is based on each region, from North to South.

VTV1

VTV2

VTV3

VTV4

VTV5

VTV6

Kênh khu vực 
Danh sách dưới đây chỉ bao gồm những trạm chính và các trạm phát lại do các kênh khu vực đặt.

LocalTV Channels 

The list below includes the local stations that broadcast at the main station. The order of the provinces is based on each region, from North to South.

District Channels 

The list below only includes TV channels in the districts of provinces and cities, sorted by region from North to South and the order of frequency channels (from 2 VHF – 62 UHF).

Other Channels

VTC

HTV

VOV

See 

Television and mass media in Vietnam
List of television channels in Vietnam

References 

Television networks
Vietnam